This is a list of the highest paved road and the highest paved pass in each European country.

Highest motorways by country

See also
 List of highest paved roads in Europe
 List of highest points of European countries
 List of mountain passes
 Transport in Europe

References

External links
 A Compendium of High Roads and Road Passes in Great Britain
 World Atlas - Highest and Lowest Points
 10 Most Beautiful Road Climbs in Europe (June 29, 2014)

Paved roads
Europe Highest Paved By Country